Agin-Buryat Autonomous Okrug was a federal subject of Russia until February 29, 2008.  On March 1, 2008, it was merged with Chita Oblast to form Zabaykalsky Krai.  During the transitional period of 2008–2009, it retained a special status within Zabaykalsky Krai.

Districts:
Aginsky (Агинский)
Urban-type settlements under the district's jurisdiction:
Aginskoye (Агинское) (administrative center)
Novoorlovsk (Новоорловск)
Orlovsky (Орловский)
with 11 rural municipal formations under the district's jurisdiction.
Duldurginsky (Дульдургинский)
with 10 rural municipal formations under the district's jurisdiction.
Mogoytuysky (Могойтуйский)
Urban-type settlements under the district's jurisdiction:
Mogoytuy (Могойтуй)
with 14 rural municipal formations under the district's jurisdiction.

References

See also
Administrative divisions of Chita Oblast
Administrative divisions of Zabaykalsky Krai

Zabaykalsky Krai
Agin